19 Days in New York is a studio album recorded by ARIA award winning artist, Kate Ceberano. It was released in September 2004 and consisted entirely of cover versions of previously released material.

Background
On 6 January 2004, Ceberano gave birth to her first child, a daughter named "Gypsy"   before travelling to New York City to record 19 Days in New York. She says; “New York is a strong part of my musical dreaming. When I was a kid I always had ambitions to go to New York to either live, play music and be part of the musical scene. If I have lived in a past life, I am sure I would have lived there because I have such a fondness for the atmosphere. I love the fact they celebrate their artists, they embrace eccentricities, they have more patience and tolerance for not so ordinary artists. It made me feel completely relaxed and in my element.”

Singles
Although no official singles were released from the album, promotional videos for "Higher and Higher" and "At Last" were released late in 2004.

Track listing

Credits
Acoustic Bass: Wilbur Bascomb
Arranged By: George Bergold (tracks: 2, 7, 8) & Leonard Caston (tracks: 1, 3 to 6, 9, 10)
Backing Vocals: La Tanya Hall, Leonard Caston, Nicki Richards
Bass: Jonathan Sanborn, Victor Flowers
Drums: Buddy Williams, Reggie Flowers
Engineer: George Karras
Executive-Producer: Pierre Baroni, Ralph Carr
Guitar: Gerald Flowers, Lou Volpe
Mastered By: David Briggs, Steve Scanlon
Mixed By: Steve Scanlon
Piano: Eric Reed, George Pearson
Producer: Billy Davis, Leonard Caston
 Exclusively licensed to Australian Broadcasting Corporation. Marketed in Australasia by Universal Music under exclusive licence.

Charts

Weekly charts

Year-end charts

References

External links

2004 albums
Covers albums
Kate Ceberano albums